Benjamin Forsyth (c. 1760June 28, 1814) was an American officer of rifle troops in the War of 1812 between Britain and the United States. Born in North Carolina, Forsyth joined the United States Army in 1800 as an officer and was a captain of the Regiment of Riflemen at the outbreak of war in 1812. He led raids into Upper Canada along the Saint Lawrence River in 1812–13 before transferring south and taking part in the battles of York and Fort George. Promoted to brevet lieutenant colonel, he held a command along Lake Champlain. Forsyth was killed in June 1814 at Odelltown, Lower Canada.

Early life 
Forsyth was born circa 1760 in either Stokes County, North Carolina or in Virginia. His parents were James Forsyth and Elizabeth Forsyth. Area records show he purchased land in Stokes County in 1794. In 1797 he married Bethemia Ladd.

Forsyth was commissioned as a second lieutenant in the 6th Infantry Regiment on April 24, 1800 and was discharged on June 15, 1800. He was commissioned as a captain in the Regiment of Riflemen on 1 July 1808.

War of 1812

Raid on Gananoque
Based at Ogdensburg, New York during the autumn and winter of 1812, he led the successful Raid on Gananoque and other attacks across the Saint Lawrence River, which threatened the British supply lines to their forces in Upper Canada.

Skirmish near the garrison of Ogdensburg
Benjamin Forsyth needed firewood for his barracks. Forsyth sent Bennet C. Riley with about a half dozen riflemen upriver to gather some wood in a boat. Riley and his men tried to stay by their side as close as possible and as stealthily as possible. But a group of British gunboats spotted Riley's boat crew and set upon them. Benjamin Forsyth and his riflemen rowed out on their boat providing sniper covering fire for Riley's crew. The British gunboats were held at bay as Riley and Forsyth both withdrew safely back to their fort in their boats.

Raid on Elizabethtown
The Raid on Elizabethtown occurred on February 7, 1813, when Benjamin Forsyth and 200 men crossed the frozen St. Lawrence River to occupy Elizabethtown and seize military and public stores, free American prisoners, then capture British military prisoners. On October 24, 1812, Forsyth wrote to President James Madison that he had served as a captain for four years without promotion and requested a brevet promotion in recognition of his service. Forsyth was promoted (not brevetted) to major on January 20, 1813 and brevetted to lieutenant colonel on February 6, 1813.

Battle of Ogdensburg
On February 22, 1813, the British used a temporary superiority in strength to drive Forsyth from his positions at the Battle of Ogdensburg. The Americans were used to seeing British troops drilling on the frozen Saint Lawrence and were taken by surprise when they suddenly charged. The riflemen in the fort held out against the frontal attack, mainly because the British guns became stuck in snow drifts, and American artillery, under Adjutant Daniel W. Church of Colonel Benedict's regiment and Lieutenant Baird of Forsyth's company, fired on the British with mixed results. At the outskirts of the town, American militia bombarded the British force with their artillery. A British flank party maneuvered to the least guarded part of the ground and broke through the weak part of the defense. American militia who had been dislodged from their position fell back while conducting a harassing fire by shooting at the British from behind houses and trees. More British flankers maneuvered through the gap to strike the American militia's main defense from behind. Soon, the British attacking from the front and rear overrun the position. The remaining American militia ran farther into the village where some of the American militiamen took cover in or behind houses provided harassing fire against the British. But the British overran the position with Forsyth's position as the remaining obstacle.

Benjamin Forsyth had placed his riflemen behind stone buildings as shelter. When the British came closer, Forsyth's riflemen and his artillery opened heavy fire causing a number of casualties on the British raiders. But the British soon overran the position and the Americans retreated. Benjamin Forsyth and his surviving riflemen all withdrew to Sacket's Harbor. The American militia either surrendered, got captured, fled to other towns, or hid amongst the civilian population. The British burned the boats and schooners frozen into the ice, and they carried off artillery and military stores. There was some looting of private property, but some of the plundered goods were later returned.

Spearheading and raiding York
Forsyth's company was ordered to join the main American force at Sackett's Harbor rather than reoccupy Ogdensburg. They led the American assault at the Battle of York. Benjamin Forsyth and Bennet C. Riley spearheaded the raid in York. It would be a massive large force of 1,700 regulars including riflemen in 14 armed vessels. Forsyth and Riley led the way with their riflemen at the front to make a beachhead. Forsyth, Riley, and the riflemen landed at the beach. The Americans engaged the British regulars, Indians, and Candians who were trying to set up a defense. Forsyth, Riley, and their riflemen hid behind trees and logs and never exposed themselves except when they fired, squatting down to load their pieces, and their clothes being green they were well camouflaged with the bushes and trees. The place chosen by the Americans for landing was very advantageous for their troops, being full of shrubs and bushes. The Americans immediately covered and cut off the British-allied forces, with little or no danger to the Americans. The British and their allies, suffering many casualties, withdrew from the field. The Americans suffered moderate casualties from resistance from British-allied remnants, magazine explosion, or other circumstances. The American raid at York was successful, however it was not without some controversy. Even though the civilians were not harmed. Many of their belongings were looted by the Americans and many private property were burned to the ground. Despite that the American commander Pike who was killed in this raid explicitly instructed his soldiers not to conduct any looting or burning private property. The Americans, after conducting their raid, withdrew from York. Forsyth, Riley, and the rest of their riflemen also withdrew.

Spearheading at Fort George
Benjamin Forsyth and his riflemen spearheaded the assault and successful takeover of British Fort George in the Battle of Fort George.

Ambush at Black Swamp Road
In July 1813, In July 1813, Benjamin Forsyth and his riflemen with the aid of Seneca Warriors and American militia under the command of militia commander Cyrenius Chapin conducted a successful ambush against the British allied Mohawks near Newark, Ontario. The American riflemen and Seneca warriors would hide on both sides of the road. While a group of Seneca and American militiamen on horses led by Cyrenius Chapin would lure the Mohawks to the ambush site by conducting a feigned retreat. Cyrenius Chapin and his combined group of mounted militia and Seneca riders rode near the Mohawks, taunted them, and rode back down the road. The Mohawks pursued. When the enemy entered the kill zone, Benjamin blew his bugle as a signal to initiate the ambush. The hidden American riflemen and Seneca gunners rose out of their concealment and opened a heavy fire on the Mohawks. The Mohawks lost 15 killed and 13 captured including a British interpreter. A few of the Mohawks escaped. The American riflemen, militia, and Seneca allies withdrew back to friendly lines with their prisoners.

Raid near Lacolle
American General Wade Hampton I led a raid in September 1813 into Champlain. After the raid, General Wade Hampton withdrew back to American lines. Major Benjamin Forsyth was stationed in Chazy. He raided into Canada capturing some British goods and several horses near Lacolle.

Raid at Odelltown
Forsyth went on another raid at Odelltown capturing a lot of goods. Many of the goods were distributed among the American soldiers as recompense for their baggage lost at Ogdensburg.

Capturing and interrogating prisoners
Bennet C. Riley was out patrolling with his other riflemen who were acting as sentries. Riley, Forsyth, and their riflemen were performing paramilitary operations in British Canada in support of America's invasion. Riley's fellow sentries captured 2 Canadian teenage boys who were acting as spies. Riley brought them before Forsyth. Forsythe and Riley did not wish to kill these teenage spies as they were just young boys. They had no intention of killing young teenage boys. So Forsyth and Riley bluffed the teenage spies into talking by pretending to threaten them with death. The ruse seemed so convincing that the teenage boys told Forsyth all valuable intelligence about a blockhouse that was being built to contest the American advance.  Then Forsyth and Riley released both teenage spies. Forsyth sent Riley to inform the American generals of the blockhouse. After Riley informed the American generals of the blockhouse, the American army easily overtook the blockhouse and routed the British-Canadian defenders.

Spearheading and besieging the British blockhouse Lacolle Mills
On March 30, 1814, Benjamin Forsyth, Bennet C. Riley, and their riflemen spearheaded an attack on British-allied forces who were retreating back to a blockhouse. The main American army followed behind. The British and their allies fell back into their blockhouse. The British and their allies were deeply entrenched and fortified in their blockhouse. Riley, Forsyth, their riflemen, and the American army besieged the blockhouse with rifle/musket fire and artillery. But the British held them off to great effect. After a long siege, the American force withdrew. British casualties were 11 killed, 44 wounded, and 4 missing. American casualties were 13 killed, 128 wounded, and 13 missing.

Long-Range Patrol
Later in the year on June 24th, 1814, Major Forsyth and his men took part in the campaign aimed at capturing Montreal, but were not present at the Battle of Crysler's Farm. Forsyth was promoted to brevet Lieutenant Colonel the following winter. He was active in skirmishing and patrolling north of Lake Champlain in the late spring and summer. On one such patrol, Benjamin Forsyth, Bennet C. Riley, and 70 of their riflemen went out from their base from Chamberlain to patrol near the Canadian border. While the Americans were patrolling in a loose skirmishing V formation. Forsyth stopped his men and had a secret conversation with Riley. Forsyth whispered to Riley that he sensed that there were Indians and Canadians hiding in ambush. Forsyth commanded Riley to tell the rest of the riflemen to casually withdraw so as not to cause the Indians and Canadians to be eager to launch their ambush. Riley suggested to Forsyth that they should withdraw to a tavern on the outskirts of this town and take shelter in it. Riley explained that they could conduct sniper fire from within the cover of the tavern. While Riley and Forsyth were marching their column casually for ten minutes. The Canadian-Indian force caught up and opened fire. All 70 American riflemen opened a simultaneous volley fire killing or wounding a number of Canadians and Indians. The Americans retreated by leapfrogging. One group of riflemen would provide covering fire while one group of riflemen retreated. The American repeated this process until they reached the tavern. Riley, Forsyth, and all their riflemen went inside the tavern. The Americans sniped at the enemy from behind covered and concealed positions within the tavern. The Americans killed or wounded more Canadians and Indians. After this intense engagement, the enemy fully retreated. The Americans were victorious. 1 American rifleman was killed and 5 wounded. The Canadian-Indian force are reported to have lost 3 killed and 5 wounded. The Americans later withdrew back to American lines in Chamberlain.

Raid to capture a spy
Benjamin Forsyth and his riflemen conducted a raid into Canadian territory and captured a British spy. Forsyth and his riflemen withdrew back to American lines with their captured British spy.

Final ambush at Odelltown and death
Benjamin Forsyth was killed in June 1814 in a clash at Odelltown, Lower Canada. On 28 June 1814, Benjamin Forsyth, commander of the American Regiment of Riflemen, advanced from Chazy, New York to Odelltown, Lower Canada intending to draw a British force of Canadians and American Indian allies into an ambush. Upon arriving at the British positions, Forsyth sent a few men forward as decoys to make contact. When the British responded, the American decoys conducted a feigned retreat, which successfully lured 150 Canadians and American Indian allies into the ambush site.

During the ensuing fight, Forsyth needlessly exposed himself by stepping on a log to watch the attack and was shot and killed. Forsyth's riflemen, still hidden and now enraged over the death of their commander, rose from their covered positions and fired a devastating volley. The British were surprised by the ambush and retreated in confusion, leaving seventeen dead on the field. Forsyth was the only American casualty. Even though Forsyth was killed, his feigned retreat and ambush succeeded at inflicting heavy casualties on the British force.

Legacy
Following his death, the people of North Carolina named Forsyth County after him. In addition, the state General Assembly paid for his son's education through special legislation and gave him a jewelled sword. Forsyth Street on Manhattan's Lower East Side is also named for him.

Notes

References

 

 

Year of birth missing
1814 deaths
United States Army personnel of the War of 1812
People from Stokes County, North Carolina
American military personnel killed in the War of 1812
United States Army officers